At the Back of the Black Man's Mind is a book by Richard Edward Dennett published in 1906.  It provides many details on the folklore, culture, and religion of the Bantu and Yoruba.

References

External links
 At the Back of the Black Man's Mind (entire text)
 At the Back of the Black Man's Mind (entire text)

1906 non-fiction books
African culture
Yoruba people